Reginald "Reggie" Bicha (born 1969) is an American social worker and government administrator.  He was the first secretary of the Wisconsin Department of Children and Families (2008–2011), and then served as director of the Colorado Department of Human Services (2011–2019).  Bicha is now President of Acelero, Inc., an educational services company in the United States.

Education
Born in 1969, Bicha was raised in La Crosse, Wisconsin. He was the first student Board of Education representative from Logan High School in La Crosse. After graduating in 1987, he enrolled at the University of Wisconsin–Eau Claire, earning a bachelor's degree in social work in 1992. Bicha then moved to Monroe County, Wisconsin, where he served as a social worker and child abuse investigator. In 2000, he was selected as a "Title IV-E Child Welfare Scholar" by the University of Minnesota, where he received a master's degree in social work.

Career
From 2001 to 2007, Bicha was the Director of Human Services in Pierce County, Wisconsin. In 2008, Wisconsin Governor Jim Doyle tapped Bicha to become the first secretary of the Wisconsin Department of Children and Families. In that capacity, Bicha consolidated more than 30 statewide programs from two agencies into a single organization. He created the “Kidstat” performance management system to measure and improve child and family outcomes. Bicha also initiated prevention and permanency objectives aimed at reducing the number of children living in foster care.

In January 2011, Colorado Governor John Hickenlooper appointed Bicha Executive Director of the Colorado Department of Human Services. Bicha is a past president of the American Public Human Services Association, and was presented the APHSA State and Local Outstanding Member Award. In May 2015, 87 Colorado legislators delivered a letter of no-confidence to Hickenlooper, asking that he "replace or correct" the highest levels of leadership at the Colorado Department of Human Services. The letter detailed problems lawmakers attributed to mismanagement. As a response, Bicha pledged to improve communication with legislators. Hickenlooper's office released a four-page rebuttal to the letter from legislators, adding that Bicha has as "tough a job as there is".

In January 2014, Bicha was recognized with the Casey Family Programs “Excellence for Children Award” and in 2012, he was selected for the Ascend Fellowship, sponsored by the Aspen Institute, to focus on approaches to moving children and parents beyond poverty.

References

External links
 Official biography from the Office of the Governor of Colorado (Archived July 27, 2018)

|-

1969 births
Living people
State cabinet secretaries of Wisconsin
State cabinet secretaries of Colorado
University of Wisconsin–Eau Claire alumni
Politicians from La Crosse, Wisconsin
University of Minnesota College of Education and Human Development alumni